The 17th Producers Guild of America Awards (also known as 2006 Producers Guild Awards), honoring the best film and television producers of 2005, were held on January 22, 2006. The ceremony at the Universal Hilton Hotel in Hollywood, California was hosted by Queen Latifah. The nominations were announced on January 4, 2006. The award for Outstanding Producer of Animated Theatrical Motion Pictures was given out for the first time at this ceremony.

Winners and nominees

Film
{| class=wikitable style="width="100%"
|-
! colspan="2" style="background:#abcdef;"| Darryl F. Zanuck Award for Outstanding Producer of Theatrical Motion Pictures
|-
| colspan="2" style="vertical-align:top;"|
 Brokeback Mountain – Diana Ossana and James Schamus Capote – Caroline Baron, William Vince, and Michael Ohoven
 Crash – Paul Haggis and Cathy Schulman
 Good Night, and Good Luck – Grant Heslov
 Walk the Line – James Keach and Cathy Konrad
|-
! colspan="2" style="background:#abcdef;"| Outstanding Producer of Animated Theatrical Motion Pictures
|-
| colspan="2" style="vertical-align:top;"|
 Wallace & Gromit: The Curse of the Were-Rabbit – Claire Jennings and Nick Park Chicken Little – Randy Fullmer
 Corpse Bride – Tim Burton and Allison Abbate
 Madagascar – Mireille Soria
 Robots – Jerry Davis, John C. Donkin, and William Joyce
|}

Television

David O. Selznick Achievement Award in Theatrical Motion PicturesRoger CormanMilestone AwardClint EastwoodProducers Guild Achievement Award in TelevisionNorman LearStanley Kramer Award
Awarded to the motion picture that best illuminates social issues.Good Night, and Good Luck

Vanguard Award
Awarded in recognition of outstanding achievement in new media and technology.
Jonathan Miller

References

 2005
2005 film awards
2005 guild awards
2005 television awards